WRNW (97.3 FM) is a sports radio station in Milwaukee, Wisconsin owned and operated by iHeartMedia. WRNW's studios are located with iHeartMedia's other Milwaukee operations in rural-suburban Greenfield, with their transmitter located with the WISN-TV tower in Milwaukee's Lincoln Park.

History

Early years (1949-1961)
The station started as WISN-FM, the second iteration of the station after a short-lived attempt in 1949 on 102.9 FM, where WHQG now resides. From the beginning, it has been a sister to WISN/1130 (starting as a straight simulcast of WISN), and for many years WISN-TV (channel 12) under the founding ownership of the Hearst Corporation.

Beautiful music (1961-1978) 
For most of 97.3's early two decades between its sign-on in January 1961 and 1978, it carried automated beautiful music like longtime rival (through Journal and Hearst's various Milwaukee ventures) WTMJ-FM, which converted to automated top 40 in 1974 as WKTI.

Rock (1978-1983) 
In January 1978, the station flipped to AOR as WLPX, using consultant Lee Abrams' "SuperStars" format. The station became an immediate success in the ratings, even pushing rival WZMF to tighten their format, and later drop it altogether for beautiful music. WLPX also sponsored future NASCAR driver Alan Kulwicki on local racetracks.

Top 40 (1983-1985) 
In the summer of 1983, WLPX abruptly switched to CHR, first as 97X, then shortly after as WBTT, B-97. WBTT was an affiliate of Dan Ingram's Top 40 Satellite Survey for a short period of time.

Adult contemporary (1985-2004)
Light adult contemporary became the format in April 1985 as "Light 97" with the WLTQ call sign. The station's DJ's, before the 1997 sale of WLTQ and WISN Radio from Hearst to iHeartMedia (then known as Clear Channel Communications), often appeared on WISN-TV in various roles, including hosting telethon and remote programming, and programs involving the Wisconsin Lottery in order to keep the line between the Channel 12 newsroom and other station operations clear from impropriety.

WLTQ featured the popular syndicated Delilah program in the evening shift.

Despite the station's high ratings over the years (particularly in the "at-work" audience), by 2003, WLTQ's ratings started dropping considerably, as the station's stodgy "Light" image turned many younger listeners away, who associated it negatively as resembling 'elevator music' with the fading of both easy listening and lite AC formats in the late 1990s into the early 2000s.

Classic rock and then Adult hits (2004-2010)
On September 17, 2004, at Noon, "Light 97.3" signed off with "We Said Hello, Goodbye" by Phil Collins. WLTQ then began stunting with songs with the words "air" or "America" in the title, telling people "Milwaukee will be TALKing about 97.3" while airing clips of Al Franken, promoting to listen the following Monday at 6 a.m. Clear Channel played into rumors of conversion of the station into a left-wing Air America-based talk format, already carried by WLTQ's sister station in Madison.

When the reformat took place though, 97.3 instead adopted an '80s-centric Classic rock format as 97.3 The Brew, launching with "(You Can Still) Rock in America" by Night Ranger. 97.3's callsign was soon changed to WQBW to match the branding. The Brew's" initial slogan was "Rock of the '80s and More". The slogan eventually changed to "The Biggest Variety of Rock Hits" as the format morphed towards adult hits. Their television ads and billboard advertisements featured an obese shirtless man named "Dancin' Kevin" based on an imaging campaign at WLUP-FM in Chicago. The station's personalities were mainly voicetracked from other Clear Channel markets.

WQBW immediately experienced ratings success with the new format, which led to direct competitors WKLH and WLZR (both sister stations owned by Saga Communications) adjusting their playlists and formats accordingly; WLZR (which had already been experiencing declines due to a decline in the format and awkward schedule flow from their talk-centric morning show) dropped its active rock format for a more older-targeting, harder-leaning mainstream rock format as "The Hog", while WKLH (shifting towards a straightforward classic rock format as the classic hits format overall became pop-centric) adopted new on-air imaging. Both of these changes drew listeners back from WQBW, prompting the station to shift towards adult hits by 2008. In addition, rival WKTI (then playing hot AC) flipped to adult hits that same year, with a playlist featuring many of the same artists being played on WQBW. With all of these changes, WQBW ended up being the lowest-rated station in the market with the format it originated.

Top 40 (2010-2018)

At 9 a.m. on May 28, 2010, after playing "The Final Countdown" by Europe, the station abruptly flipped to CHR with the branding "97-3 Radio Now", launching with "Tik Tok" by Ke$ha. The move was made quickly to pre-empt an expected format change by WJZX. A day earlier, WJZX ended its smooth jazz format and began a stunt format known as "Tiger Radio." The station's new format was likely to be Rhythmic Top 40 under the new callsign WNQW, which prompted Clear Channel to act quickly and claim the "Now" name and brand before WJZX owner Saga Communications could claim it. The airstaff and the morning show returned to the station on July 26, though the title of the morning show changed to "Connie and Curtis" after "Fish" Calloway's departure a week after the format change (Calloway would later take the morning slot at WZEE's Rhythmic Top 40 rival in Madison, WJQM).

On June 10, 2010, WQBW's call letters were officially changed to WRNW. These calls had previously been used from 1960 until 1982 for WXPK in the New York City suburb of Briarcliff Manor, the station where Howard Stern first came into the broadcasting industry.

WRNW's format change gave longtime top 40 powerhouse WXSS their first in-market competition since WKTI's switch to WLWK. WRNW's Top 40 musical direction favors a pop/rock approach, as it plays less Rhythmic/Hip-Hop than WXSS and most other large market Top 40 (CHR) stations. This musical direction both differentiates the station from WXSS and protects WRNW's urban sister station, WKKV.

On August 31, 2012, Connie and Curtis was ended on both WZEE and WRNW, to be replaced with Clear Channel's internally syndicated Elvis Duran and the Morning Show on September 4. That same week, WRNW picked up new competition from WZBK-FM, who, after WRNW beat them to the punch with the "Radio Now" format flip, finally made the switch to Rhythmic Top 40, this time as "Energy 106.9," (and new call letters WNRG-FM) on September 7, 2012.

In late April 2015, the station re-branded as "97-3 Now" and given a logo resembling that of iHeartMedia's KISS-FM branded stations (a branding WXSS holds local rights to), though with no major changes to the format or schedule.

On September 14, 2016, the station announced that the morning show would be brought back to being hosted locally in-house, with former WXSS morning personality Rahny Taylor returning to Milwaukee after a three-year stint on the national K-Love network to host the new show, starting the next day.

Sports (2018-present)
Just after Midnight on November 27, 2018, after playing "Eastside" by Benny Blanco and a commercial break, WRNW flipped to sports talk as 97.3 The Game, inheriting the local programming of sister AM station WOKY (including Drew & KB, The Crossover, The Mike Heller Show, and The Double Team). Fox Sports Radio programs are carried between 7 p.m. and 6 a.m. and on weekends. With this change, WOKY shifted to a largely syndicated lineup, carrying most of the national Fox Sports Radio lineup. WRNW also carries coverage of Wisconsin Badgers sports from Learfield Sports in lieu of the former split between WOKY and WRIT-FM, along with WOKY's former national rights with Westwood One Sports and the three NASCAR radio networks (MRN/PRN/IMSRN); for the Badgers, games continue to also air on WOKY. Much of WRNW's daytime schedule has been subsequently syndicated across the state of Wisconsin, mainly to stations owned by Midwest Communications, as of November 2, 2020 (iHeartMedia's presence in those markets is limited due to market concentration among other station groups). That group runs WRNW's programming on WNFL in Green Bay, WRIG in the Wausau market, and WDSM in Duluth–Superior, along with their associated urban FM translators, with WDSM specifically taking "The Game" branding full-time. In March 2021, WTSO in Madison, formerly co-branded with WOKY, began to air the full WRNW schedule in Madison; it had already taken "The Game" branding in association with Fox Sports Radio in early 2020.

On October 27, 2021, the Green Bay Packers announced that WRNW would become the team's Milwaukee affiliate for the Packers Radio Network in 2022, ending a 93-year run on WTMJ, which had served as flagship station for most of that time. The team was already airing on iHeartMedia stations in Madison, Eau Claire, and Moline, Illinois.

WRNW-HD2
On April 25, 2006, Clear Channel announced that WQBW's HD2 subchannel would carry Radio Radio from their Format Lab, a format focusing on classic modern rock hits.  It was later replaced by the Rock Nation feed from Format Lab, which features active rock. Later on from February 2011 until August 2012, the HD2 signal carried iHeartRadio's "Spin Cycle" automated format with dance/EDM tracks.

At the beginning of August 2012, the HD2 signal began to carry the audio of WISN; although their AM signal is also carried in HD Radio, it is limited after sunset. This returns what had begun as WISN-FM to carrying their AM sister station in some form for the first time in decades.

History of callsign
The callsign WISN-FM was previously assigned to a Milwaukee station that began broadcasting July 11, 1949. It broadcast on 102.9 MHz, a frequency now held by WHQG.

References

External links

"Connie & Curtis" website
"New format is going to party like it's 1989" (JSonline.com)
"WLTQ-FM changed on its own, honest" (JSonline.com)

RNW
Radio stations established in 1961
1961 establishments in Wisconsin
IHeartMedia radio stations
Sports radio stations in the United States
Fox Sports Radio stations